Sethoxydim is a postemergent herbicide for control of grass weeds in a wide variety of horticultural crops.

Sethoxydim is sold under brand names including Poast, Torpedo, Ultima, Vantage, Conclude, and Rezult. It is manufactured by BASF, TopPro, and Monterey Lawn and Garden.

Mode of Action
Sethoxydim is a substituted 1,3-cyclohexanedione DIM herbicide, a type of Acetyl-CoA carboxylase inhibitor (ACCase herbicide), WSSA/HRAC Group 1 (formerly in HRAC A).

Resistance

Resistant crops
Maize/corn resistant to ACCase inhibitors has been produced by selection under sethoxydim application.

References

DIM herbicides
Post-emergent herbicides